Uperodon obscurus is a species of frog in the family Microhylidae. It is endemic to Sri Lanka.
Its natural habitats are subtropical or tropical moist lowland forests, subtropical or tropical moist montane forests, freshwater marshes, intermittent freshwater marshes, rural gardens, and heavily degraded former forest.

References

obscurus
Frogs of Sri Lanka
Endemic fauna of Sri Lanka
Taxa named by Albert Günther
Amphibians described in 1864
Taxonomy articles created by Polbot